Associazione di Fondazioni e di Casse di Risparmio S.p.A. (Association of Foundations and Savings Banks) is an Italian banking association. The members were the savings banks ( or singular cassa di risparmio) of Italy, or the foundation that originate from the reform trigger by Legge Amato.

History
The association was found in 1912 as Associazione fra le Casse di Risparmio Italiane (ACRI) (Association of Italian Savings Banks). After 25 years of merger and acquisitions, only 24 member banks (including banks with mount of piety origins) survived, with only eight of them were owned by their original banking foundations, plus Banca Carige that went fully publicly owned. The rest of the savings bank that survived from their establishments until 1991, became part of Intesa Sanpaolo, UniCredit, Banco BPM, UBI Banca, BPER Banca, Banca Popolare di Bari, Credito Valtellinese, Banca Carige, Banca di Asti, Crédit Agricole Italia and other banking group. Moreover, two more savings banks, Cariparma and Biverbanca were not members of ACRI.

The surviving banks were either independent banks (such as Banca Carige, Cassa di Risparmio di Ravenna, Südtiroler Sparkasse, etc.), subsidiaries (e.g. Banca CR Firenze and Carisbo) or minority owned by major banking group (e.g. Banca di Asti and Banca Cassa di Risparmio di Savigliano).

ACRI members (the foundations) also owned 18.4% stake collectively in Cassa Depositi e Prestiti. The members also involved in the investment fund F2i First and Second Fund.

In 2015 85 out of 86 member foundations of ACRI (except Fondazione Cassa di Risparmio di Fossano) had signed a memorandum of understanding with Ministry of Economy and Finance for the new regulation on the assets of the foundations.

According to ACRI, the collective shareholders' equity of 87 out of 88 foundations were €41,243,344,914. (including non-member Roma and Pisa but data from Carige was missing) However, the value of the assets were based on the historic price, such as the price of the shares of the bank.

In 2016 the foundations were invited to invest back to banking sector by joining the private equity fund Atlante that aiming to recapitalize the weak bank and purchase the  securitizated non-performing loan.

Members

Foundations

 Compagnia di San Paolo
 Ente Cassa di Risparmio di Firenze
 Fondazione Agostino De Mari Cassa di Risparmio di Savona
 Fondazione Banca del Monte di Foggia
 Fondazione Banca del Monte di Lombardia
 Fondazione Banca del Monte di Lucca
 Fondazione Banca del Monte di Rovigo
 Fondazione Banca del Monte e Cassa di Risparmio Faenza
 Fondazione Banca Nazionale delle Comunicazioni
 
 Fondazione Cassa dei Risparmi di Forlì
 Fondazione Cassa di Risparmio della Provincia dell'Aquila
 Fondazione Cassa di Risparmio della Provincia di Chieti
 Fondazione Cassa di Risparmio della Provincia di Macerata
 Fondazione Cassa di Risparmio della Provincia di Viterbo
 Fondazione Cassa di Risparmio delle Provincie Lombarde
 Fondazione Cassa di Risparmio della Spezia
 Fondazione Cassa di Risparmio di Alessandria
 Fondazione Cassa di Risparmio di Ascoli Piceno
 Fondazione Cassa di Risparmio di Asti
 Fondazione Cassa di Risparmio di Biella
 Fondazione Cassa di Risparmio di Bolzano
 Fondazione Cassa di Risparmio di Bra
 Fondazione Cassa di Risparmio di Calabria e di Lucania
 Fondazione Cassa di Risparmio di Carpi
 Fondazione Cassa di Risparmio di Carrara
 Fondazione Cassa di Risparmio di Cento
 Fondazione Cassa di Risparmio di Cesena
 Fondazione Cassa di Risparmio di Città di Castello
 Fondazione Cassa di Risparmio di Civitavecchia
 Fondazione Cassa di Risparmio di Cuneo
 Fondazione Cassa di Risparmio di Fabriano e Cupramontana
 Fondazione Cassa di Risparmio di Fano
 Fondazione Cassa di Risparmio di Fermo
 Fondazione Cassa di Risparmio di Ferrara
 Fondazione Cassa di Risparmio di Foligno
 Fondazione Cassa di Risparmio di Fossano
 Fondazione Cassa di Risparmio di Genova e Imperia
 Fondazione Cassa di Risparmio di Gorizia
 Fondazione Cassa di Risparmio di Imola
 Fondazione Cassa di Risparmio di Jesi
 Fondazione Cassa di Risparmio di Loreto
 Fondazione Cassa di Risparmio di Lucca
 Fondazione Cassa di Risparmio di Mirandola
 Fondazione Cassa di Risparmio di Modena 
 Fondazione Cassa di Risparmio di Orvieto
 Fondazione Cassa di Risparmio di Padova e Rovigo
 Fondazione Cassa di Risparmio di Parma e Monte Busseto
 Fondazione Cassa di Risparmio di Perugia
 Fondazione Cassa di Risparmio di Pesaro
 Fondazione Cassa di Risparmio di Pistoia e Pescia
 Fondazione Cassa di Risparmio di Prato
 Fondazione Cassa di Risparmio di Ravenna
 Fondazione Cassa di Risparmio di Reggio Emilia –  Pietro Manodori
 Fondazione Cassa di Risparmio di Rimini
 Fondazione Cassa di Risparmio di Saluzzo
 Fondazione Cassa di Risparmio di San Miniato
 Fondazione Cassa di Risparmio di Savigliano
 Fondazione Cassa di Risparmio di Spoleto
 Fondazione Cassa di Risparmio di Terni e Narni
 Fondazione Cassa di Risparmio di Torino
 Fondazione Cassa di Risparmio di Tortona
 Fondazione Cassa di Risparmio di Trento e Rovereto
 Fondazione Cassa di Risparmio di Trieste
 Fondazione Cassa di Risparmio di Udine e Pordenone
 Fondazione Cassa di Risparmio di Vercelli
 Fondazione Cassa di Risparmio di Verona, Vicenza, Belluno e Ancona
 Fondazione Cassa di Risparmio di Vignola
 Fondazione Cassa di Risparmio di Volterra
 Fondazione Cassa di Risparmio e Banca del Monte di Lugo
 Fondazione Cassa di Risparmio in Bologna	
 Fondazione Cassa di Risparmio Salernitana
 Fondazione Cassamarca
 Fondazione del Monte di Bologna e Ravenna
 Fondazione di Piacenza e Vigevano
 Fondazione di Sardegna 	
 Fondazione di Venezia
 Fondazione Livorno
 Fondazione Monte dei Paschi di Siena
 Fondazione Monte di Parma
 Fondazione Monte di Pietà di Vicenza
 Fondazione Pescarabruzzo
 Fondazione Puglia
 Fondazione Sicilia
 Fondazione Tercas
 Fondazione Varrone Cassa di Risparmio di Rieti

Banks

 Cassa di Risparmio di Asti (Banca di Asti)
 Banca Carige
 Banca Carim, subsidiary of Crédit Agricole Italia
 Banca Cassa di Risparmio di Savigliano
 Banca CR Firenze, subsidiary of Intesa Sanpaolo
 Banca del Monte di Lucca, subsidiary of Banca Carige
 Banco di Sardegna, subsidiary of BPER Banca
 Cassa dei Risparmi di Forlì e della Romagna, subsidiary of Intesa Sanpaolo
 Cassa di Risparmio del Friuli Venezia Giulia, subsidiary of Intesa Sanpaolo
 Cassa di Risparmio del Veneto, subsidiary of Intesa Sanpaolo
 Cassa di Risparmio della Spezia, subsidiary of Crédit Agricole Italia
 Cassa di Risparmio di Bra, subsidiary of BPER Banca
 Cassa di Risparmio di Cento
 Cassa di Risparmio di Cesena, subsidiary of Crédit Agricole Italia
 Cassa di Risparmio di Fermo
 Cassa di Risparmio di Fossano
 Cassa di Risparmio di Orvieto, subsidiary of Banca Popolare di Bari
 Cassa di Risparmio di Pistoia e della Lucchesia, subsidiary of Intesa Sanpaolo
 Cassa di Risparmio di Ravenna
 Cassa di Risparmio di Saluzzo, subsidiary of BPER Banca
 Cassa di Risparmio di San Miniato, subsidiary of Crédit Agricole Italia
 Cassa di Risparmio di Volterra
 Cassa di Risparmio in Bologna, subsidiary of Intesa Sanpaolo
 Südtiroler Sparkasse – Cassa di Risparmio di Bolzano

former members

 Fondazione Pisa
 Fondazione Roma
 Banca dell'Adriatico (merged into Intesa Sanpaolo)
 Cassa di Risparmio di Loreto (merged into UBI Banca)
 Casse di Risparmio dell'Umbria (merged into Intesa Sanpaolo)
 Nuova Banca delle Marche (merged into UBI Banca)
 Nuova Cassa di Risparmio di Chieti (merged into UBI Banca)
 Nuova Cassa di Risparmio di Ferrara (merged into BPER Banca)

References

External links

 

Banking in Italy
Business organisations based in Italy
Organizations established in 1912
1912 establishments in Italy